Penelope Tsilika is a Greek actress.  Tsilika starred in the 2013 film Little England directed by Pantelis Voulgaris.  Her other film credits include The Interrogation and Kala azar.  She was also one of the stars of the television series I lexi pou de les.

Tsilka was born in Athens. She is a graduate of the Athens Academy of Drama and Athens Law School.

Awards and nominations

References

External links

Actresses from Athens
Living people
Year of birth missing (living people)
21st-century Greek actresses
Greek film actresses